Thieusies is a village of Wallonia and a district of the municipality of Soignies, located in the province of Hainaut, Belgium.

With the others villages Casteau, Horrues, Chaussée-Notre-Dame-Louvignies, Naast, Neufvilles,  and Soignies (town), they compose the municipality of Soignies since 1977.

Gallery

Chateau de Thieusies 

Former municipalities of Hainaut (province)